The 1952 Little League World Series was held from August 26 to August 29 in Williamsport, Pennsylvania. A team from Norwalk, Connecticut, beat Monongahela, Pennsylvania, by a score of 4–3 in the championship game of the 6th Little League World Series.  A team from Montreal, Quebec, Canada, became the first participants from outside the United States in the history of the event.

Attendees at the championship game included Frank Shaughnessy, president of the International League, and Will Harridge, president of the American League.

Teams

Results

References

Further reading

External links 
 1952 Tournament Bracket via Wayback Machine
1952 Line Scores via Wayback Machine

History of Norwalk, Connecticut
Little League World Series
Little League World Series
Little League World Series